A number of slang terms have been used on Drag Race. Some terms in the list already existed within drag culture, but were more widely popularized by their use on various iterations of the show, while others originated within the franchise itself. During his 2018 appearance on The Late Show with Stephen Colbert, RuPaul described some of the show's terminology to host Stephen Colbert.

List of terms and definitions

 

Slang terms used on the series have included:

See also

 LGBT slang
 List of LGBT slang terms

References

External links
 

Terminology
LGBT slang